Wilf Doyle (2 April 1925 — 8 June 2012) was a Canadian folk musician, generally regarded as one of the pioneers of accordion music of Newfoundland. In 2007, the Newfoundland and Labrador Folk Festival gave him a Lifetime Achievement Award.

Doyle was born in Conception Harbour. He played accordion from the age of nine, and in 1944, started performing with his band, Wilf Doyle and His Orchestra. He was first recorded in 1956 and went on to make 11 records, being regular at TV and radio broadcasts. He performed mainly traditional Newfoundland songs, well known as well as less known.

William Keating, a member of the Wilf Doyle band, founded the rock group, The Keatniks, based in Labrador City. The group in 1965 made the first rock-and-roll record by native Newfoundlanders.

Albums
From 1956 
 Jigs and reels of Newfoundland
 Wilf Doyle and his orchestra play the quadrilles and a selection of favorite Newfoundland old time music
 The mighty Churchill
 More dance favorites
 The isle of Newfoundland
 The sailor's alphabet
 Souvenirs and memories

References

Canadian folk musicians
2012 deaths
Musicians from Newfoundland and Labrador
Canadian accordionists
1925 births